Doctor Syn on the High Seas is the second in the series of Doctor Syn novels by Russell Thorndike.  It tells the story of how the young clergyman, Christopher Syn, loses his wife to a seducer.  He embarks on a quest of vengeance, taking on the identity of the pirate Captain Clegg to hunt them down.

The book ends with Syn returning to his home of Dymchurch to resume his life as a vicar.  Imogene dies in childbirth and Nick, the seducer, is hanged as a pirate.

Doctor Syn on the High Seas was published in 1936.  Though it is the second book written in the series, this novel is the first in terms of the sequence of events in Syn's life.  It is followed by Doctor Syn Returns.

1936 British novels
Historical novels
Novels set in Kent
Novels by Russell Thorndike
Rich & Cowan books